John Douglas Pridnia (March 16, 1943 – November 17, 2016) was an American politician in the state of Michigan.

Pridnia was born in Detroit, Michigan and attended Macomb Community College and Wayne State University. A Republican, he represented the 106th district in the Michigan House of Representatives from 1989 to 1990 and the 36th District in the Michigan Senate from 1991 to 1994 (36th district). In 2016, it was announced that he had amyotrophic lateral sclerosis (ALS).

Pridnia died on November 17, 2016, aged 73.

References

1943 births
2016 deaths
Politicians from Detroit
Wayne State University alumni
Businesspeople from Michigan
Republican Party members of the Michigan House of Representatives
Republican Party Michigan state senators
20th-century American businesspeople
20th-century American politicians